Francis Stewart Boyce  (26 June 1872 – 27 June 1940) was an Australian politician and judge.

He was born in Rockley to Francis Bertie Boyce and Caroline Stewart. He attended The King's School in Parramatta, Sydney Grammar School and then Rugby School in England, before studying at the University of Sydney. He qualified with a Bachelor of Arts in 1893 and a Bachelor of Law in 1896, being called to the bar the following year. In 1901 he married Norah Glasson, with whom he had five children. He was an acting judge on the District Court in 1916. In 1923 he was appointed to the New South Wales Legislative Council as a Nationalist. He took silk in 1924, the year in which he was appointed a minister without portfolio in the government. He held that position until 1925, and from 1927 to 1930 served as Attorney-General and Vice-President of the Executive Council. He resigned from the Council in 1932 to take up an appointment as a judge in divorce on the New South Wales Supreme Court. Boyce died at Pymble in 1940.

Honours Received
Kings Counsel (KC) 1924

References

1872 births
1940 deaths
Nationalist Party of Australia members of the Parliament of New South Wales
United Australia Party members of the Parliament of New South Wales
Members of the New South Wales Legislative Council
Attorneys General of New South Wales
Judges of the Supreme Court of New South Wales
Australian King's Counsel
Judges of the District Court of NSW
20th-century Australian judges